Kassina maculifer is a species of frog in the family Hyperoliidae.
It is found in Ethiopia, Kenya, and Somalia.
Its natural habitats are dry savanna, subtropical or tropical dry shrubland, freshwater marshes, and intermittent freshwater marshes.
It is threatened by habitat loss.

References

Kassina
Taxonomy articles created by Polbot
Amphibians described in 1924